Michael J. Kruger is an American theologian and the President and the Samuel C. Patterson Professor of New Testament and Early Christianity at Reformed Theological Seminary in Charlotte, NC. He is ordained in the Evangelical Presbyterian Church.

Education and career
He obtained his bachelor's degree from the University of North Carolina at Chapel Hill followed by an M. Div. from Westminster Seminary California. His doctoral studies were at the University of Edinburgh where his advisor was Larry Hurtado. His dissertation is a study of P.Oxy. 840.

During the 2009-2010 academic year he was a visiting scholar at Saint Edmund's College, Cambridge.

Thought and Research
Kruger's work focuses on the Canon of the New Testament, particularly how the Christian church has historically understood which books belong in the Bible.

References

Bibliography

External links
 
 

American theologians
Living people
Year of birth missing (living people)